Provincial Highway 66 is an expressway, which begins in Guanyin District, Taoyuan City on Provincial Highway 61 and ends in Daxi District, Taoyuan City, on County Road 112A.

Major urban areas along the route
Yangmei District
Pingzhen District
Zhongli District
Daxi District

Major intersections

{| class="plainrowheaders wikitable"
|-
!scope=col|City
!scope=col|Location
!scope=col|km
!scope=col|Mile
!scope=col|Exit
!scope=col|Name
!scope=col|Destinations
!scope=col|Notes
|-

Notes
The elevation of the main line between Provincial Highway 31 and Township Road 102 was completed in June 2014.

References

Taiwanese Directorate General of Highways, MOTC

Highways in Taiwan